Jan-Marc Schneider (born 25 March 1994) is a German professional footballer who plays as a forward for  club FSV Zwickau.

Career
On 23 October 2017, Schneider scored his first professional goal for FC St. Pauli's first team. On 10 July 2021, he signed a contract with PAS Giannina.

In January 2023, Schneider joined FSV Zwickau on a contract until the end of the season.

References

1994 births
Living people
German footballers
Footballers from Hamburg
Association football forwards
Germany youth international footballers
2. Bundesliga players
Regionalliga players
Super League Greece players
FC St. Pauli players
FC St. Pauli II players
FC Eintracht Norderstedt 03 players
SSV Jahn Regensburg players
PAS Giannina F.C. players
FSV Zwickau players
German expatriate footballers
German expatriate sportspeople in Greece
Expatriate footballers in Greece